Jess Jackson may refer to:

 Jess Stonestreet Jackson Jr. (1930–2011), American wine entrepreneur and lawyer
 Jess Jackson (record producer) (born 1980), British record producer

See also
 Jesse Jackson (disambiguation)